The St. James Cathedral Also Moyobamba Cathedral Is the main Catholic church of the Prelature of Moyobamba and of the Region of San Martín, is in the Center of Moyobamba a city of the South American country of Peru.

The Moyobamba Cathedral occupies the north side of the Moyobamba Plaza de Armas, in Jirón Callao, on the corner of Pedro Canga. Formerly occupied the north-east side of the square, where it was its real location, but because of the earthquake that struck the city was built in the current location, and in the old cathedral was built a monument dedicated to the Sacred Heart of Jesus.

See also
Roman Catholicism in Peru

References

Roman Catholic cathedrals in Peru
Roman Catholic churches completed in 1950
20th-century Roman Catholic church buildings in Peru